The action of Juncalito was a military engagement of the Argentine War of Independence, previous to the Crossing of the Andes campaign. 

On March 10, 1816, nine months before the crossing of the Andes, José Félix Aldao led a group of Mounted Grenadiers to the Uspallata Pass. They had to find out whether the pass was secure or the Spanish Royalists had fortified it. They found a scout Royalist group, and managed to capture them without firing a single shot. They captured a sergeant, a corporal and 15 soldiers. 

With this information, San Martín spread the news that the bulk of the army would cross to Chile by Uspallata. This was in order to deceive the Royalists in Chile, as they kept fortifying that zone, but the bulk of the Army of the Andes actually moved near the city of Mendoza.

Bibliography
 

Battles of the Argentine War of Independence
Conflicts in 1816
1816 in Argentina
Battles and conflicts without fatalities
March 1816 events